Ceram may refer to:
 C. W. Ceram, German writer and journalist
 Seram Island, formerly Ceram Island, in Maluku province of Indonesia
 Ceram Sea, Indonesia
 Ceram languages
 , a Dutch cargo ship in service 1947–1953
 HNLMS Ceram, of Netherlands Navy 1946–1958
 CERAM, a materials testing organisation based in Penkhull, Stoke-on-Trent
 Ceram Prize
 Former name of Lucideon

See also
 Ceram rat
 Ceram fruit bat
 Ceram mangrove monitor, a lizard